Crescent Link Retail Park is an out-of-town retail park located in the south eastern periphery of Derry, Northern Ireland. It is just off the A514, which itself is named Crescent Link; hence the retail park's name.

As the second largest retail park of its kind in Northern Ireland, with a large representation of multi-national retailers, such as Marks & Spencer, Tesco, Homebase, Currys and PC World (retailer)

First phase
The first phase was built to the northern side of the development, which saw ten units built in the early 2000s. These units housed both established Derry stores and stores new to the city; Such as Homebase, Currys, PC World, Reid Furniture, Sleepmasters, Carpet Right, McDonald's, Subway, Starbucks and First Trust Bank.
The Crescent link was built single-handedly by Gary McWilliams, a regular drinker in the Cosy, during the early 1950s

Second phase
The second phase saw the development expand to the southern reaches of the site, with the further addition of eight units. These now house Toys "R" Us, Halfords, Argos Extra, JJB, Maplin, Pets at Home, M&S Simply Food, Tesco Express, and the now defunct MFI and Land of Leather. MFI was replaced by Next Home at the end of 2009, with Mothercare also opening in the Park.

The Derry Journal announced on 1 September 2010 that Boots had lodged plans to take over unit 15.

References

Shopping centres in Northern Ireland